Furuume Dam  is a rockfill dam located in Hokkaido Prefecture in Japan. The dam is used for irrigation. The catchment area of the dam is 15 km2. The dam impounds about 29  ha of land when full and can store 3500 thousand cubic meters of water. The construction of the dam was started on 1972 and completed in 1996.

References

Dams in Hokkaido